Gary R. Alcorn (October 8, 1936 – November 29, 2006) was an American basketball player.

He played collegiately for California State University, Fresno.

He was selected by the Detroit Pistons in the third round (18th pick overall) of the 1959 NBA Draft.

He played in the NBA for the Pistons (1959–60) and Los Angeles Lakers (1960–61) for the total of 78 games.

In 1982, Alcorn was inducted into the Fresno County Athletic Hall of Fame.

References 

1936 births
2006 deaths
American men's basketball players
Basketball players from California
Centers (basketball)
Detroit Pistons draft picks
Detroit Pistons players
Fresno State Bulldogs men's basketball players
Los Angeles Lakers players
Sportspeople from Fresno, California